Emma Rose Kenney (born September 14, 1999) is an American actress. She has portrayed Deborah "Debbie" Gallagher on Shameless from 2011 to 2021, and Harris Conner-Healy in the tenth season of the family sitcom Roseanne and its spin-off continuation The Conners.

Early life 
Kenney was born on September 14, 1999, in New York City. Her parents are Gillian Kenney, a criminal defense lawyer, and Kevin Kenney, a sports writer who formerly wrote for the New York Post and now works for Fox Sports.

Career
Kenney made several appearances in short and made-for-television films. In 2009, at nine years old, she was the youngest filmmaker to be a finalist at the New Jersey International Film Festival at Rutgers University.

Kenney appeared as Debbie Gallagher, the on-air daughter of William H. Macy in the comedic drama Shameless. Kenney won the role at 10 years old, while attending Park Middle School in Scotch Plains, New Jersey. 

In September 2017, it was announced that Kenney would appear in the 10th season of Roseanne, which served as a revival of the series and premiered on ABC on March 27, 2018. She portrays Harris Conner Healy, the granddaughter of the sitcom's titular character. Kenney appeared alongside many of the show's original cast members, including Roseanne Barr, John Goodman, Laurie Metcalf, and Sara Gilbert, with Gilbert portraying her TV mother, Darlene Conner Healy. On May 29, 2018, ABC cancelled the revival after one season.

ABC subsequently ordered a Roseanne spin-off called The Conners, which would not include Roseanne Barr, but would retain the remaining main cast, including Kenney. The Conners premiered on October 16, 2018.

Filmography

Film

Television

References

External links
 
 Debbie Gallagher on Showtime

1999 births
Living people
American film actresses
American television actresses
American child actresses
People from Manhattan
21st-century American actresses
Actresses from New York City